Eunidia plagiata is a species of beetle in the family Cerambycidae. It was described by Charles Joseph Gahan in 1898. It is known from Chad, Kenya, Zimbabwe, Mozambique, Ethiopia, South Africa, Botswana, and Tanzania.

Subspecies
 Eunidia plagiata plagiata Gahan, 1898
 Eunidia plagiata teocchii Adlbauer, 2000

References

Eunidiini
Beetles of Africa
Beetles described in 1898
Taxa named by Charles Joseph Gahan